Yan Victor Silva Paixão, known as Yan Victor (born 18 September 1995) is a Brazilian football player who plays for Malaysia Super League club Kelantan United.

Club career
He made his professional debut in the Segunda Liga for Gil Vicente on 27 November 2016 in a game against Porto B.

References

External links
 

1995 births
Sportspeople from Bahia
Living people
Brazilian footballers
Brazilian expatriate footballers
Association football defenders
São José Esporte Clube players
Gil Vicente F.C. players
C.D. Cova da Piedade players
Liga Portugal 2 players
Campeonato de Portugal (league) players
Expatriate footballers in Portugal
Expatriate footballers in Malaysia
Brazilian expatriate sportspeople in Portugal
Kelantan United F.C. players